Huntington Ravine is a glacial cirque on Mount Washington in the White Mountains of New Hampshire.  It is named for Joshua H. Huntington, the Principal Assistant to State Geologist Charles H. Hitchcock (1836–1919) for the Geological Survey of New Hampshire.

Of the four major cirques on Mount Washington (Tuckerman and Huntington ravines, Oakes Gulf, and the Great Gulf), it has the steepest and highest headwall. Only one hiking trail ascends Huntington Ravine toward Mount Washington's summit; that trail, the Huntington Ravine Trail, crosses a boulder field, ascends a talus fan, and winds steeply up the center of the cirque's headwall, requiring several tricky scrambling moves that may be intimidating for less-experienced (or more acrophobic) hikers.

All other portions of the headwall are too steep to climb safely without climbing gear and technical expertise.  Several popular rock-climbing routes, such as the Pinnacle route and the Henderson Ridge, do ascend the ravine, and in the winter the Pinnacle Gully is especially popular as an ice-climbing challenge.  Because the ravine is higher and more exposed to the elements than most other climbing areas in the eastern United States, rock and ice climbing — and even hiking — are risky and weather-dependent.  Avalanches, icefalls, and hypothermia have killed climbers in Huntington repeatedly in recent years, and the hiking path is usually not passable until late May or early June.

See also 
 Presidential Range
 White Mountain National Forest

References

External links
 SummitPost - Huntington Ravine Trail - Climbing, Hiking & Mountaineering

Mount Washington (New Hampshire)
Cirques of the United States
Landforms of Coös County, New Hampshire